The Samahang Weightlifting ng Pilipinas or the SWP (formerly known as the Philippine Weightlifting Association) is the national governing body for weightlifting and powerlifting in the Philippines. The president of the SWP since October 2016 is Monico Puentevella.

References

External links
 Philippine Weightlifting Association profile at the Philippine Olympic Committee website

Philippines
Weightlifting in the Philippines
Weightlifting